Consadole Sapporo is a Japanese football club.  Its 2001 season results are set out below.

Competitions

Domestic results

J.League 1

Emperor's Cup

J.League Cup

Player statistics

Other pages
 J.League official site

Consadole Sapporo
Hokkaido Consadole Sapporo seasons